Mineral Mound State Park is a park located on the shores of Lake Barkley in Lyon County, Kentucky, United States. The  park contains an 18-hole golf course with clubhouse, a boat ramp, fishing pier, and picnicking area. Mineral Mound is named after the mansion of Willis B. Machen, which formerly stood on the property.

References

External links
Mineral Mound State Park Kentucky Department of Parks

State parks of Kentucky
Protected areas of Lyon County, Kentucky
Protected areas established in 2003